Tillandsia rubroviolacea is a species of flowering plant in the family Bromeliaceae. It is endemic to Ecuador.  Its natural habitat is subtropical or tropical dry shrubland. It is threatened by habitat loss.

References

rubroviolacea
Endemic flora of Ecuador
Endangered plants
Taxonomy articles created by Polbot